John Campbell Boot, 2nd Baron Trent, KBE (19 January 1889 – 8 March 1956), was the son of the Sir Jesse Boot who turned the Boots Company into a major national company, and Florence Boot. He was educated at The Leys School and Jesus College, Cambridge, and served in the First World War. In 1914 he married Margaret Pyman and had four daughters.

The 2nd Lord Trent continued his father's expansion of the company. Like his father, he was also a philanthropist who was keenly involved with the City of Nottingham. In 1944 he was appointed President of University College, Nottingham, and, after it was granted full university status in 1948 as the University of Nottingham, became its first Chancellor.

Following Lord Trent's retirement as Chancellor, the Boots Company endowed the Lord Trent Chair of Pharmaceutical Chemistry and Lady Trent Chair of Chemical Engineering in his honour.

Arms

References

1889 births
1956 deaths
People associated with the University of Nottingham
Alumni of Jesus College, Cambridge
20th-century British businesspeople
Sherwood Foresters officers
Barons in the Peerage of the United Kingdom
Knights Commander of the Order of the British Empire
British Army personnel of World War I